Tim Dlulane (born 5 June 1981) is a South African former rugby union player.

Biography
Born in Umtata, Dlulane later on furthered his education in Kokstad at Kokstad College. This is where he first started his rugby career.

Whilst playing for the Pumas, Dlulane was included in the Springboks squad for the end of year tours in Europe in 2004. He came off the bench in a Test against Wales at the Millennium Stadium in Cardiff. South Africa won the match by two points, 38 to 36. He produced a man-of-the-match performance as well as scoring a try for the Blue Bulls in the win over the Free State Cheetahs in the 2006 Currie Cup. Dlulane sustained a neck injury in a 2006 Currie Cup match and had an operation to correct the damage.

After his playing career, Dlulane acted as senior team manager at the Bulls in the international Super Rugby competition until 2017.

Test history

See also
List of South Africa national rugby union players – Springbok no. 762

References

External links
Tim Dluane on sarugby.com
Tim Dluane on the Springbok Rugby Hall of Fame
Blue Bulls article
iol article

1981 births
Living people
People from Mthatha
South African rugby union players
South Africa international rugby union players
Bulls (rugby union) players
Blue Bulls players
Pumas (Currie Cup) players
Rugby union players from the Eastern Cape
Rugby union flankers